"Boys" is the second single released by The Maybes? from their debut album, Promise. It was released on 16 June 2008 on Xtra Mile Recordings and a music video was filmed for the single.

Music video
The video for Boys was filmed on 26 April 2008 at Nation, Liverpool during the first date of The Maybes?'s club event "Sonic Temple". The video will be part of a documentary recorded by the band for the European Capital of Culture year in Liverpool.

Track listing
Download Single
Boys

7" single
Boys
A Girl Called Desire

Reviews
ClickMusic.com 3.5/5
ThisIsNotTV.co.uk
NoizeMakesEnemies.co.uk
AllGigs.co.uk

References

External links
Myspace profile
Facebook page

2008 singles
2008 songs
Xtra Mile Recordings singles